Vesta is the debut studio album by American R&B singer Vesta Williams, released on December 15, 1986 on A&M Records.

Commercial performance
The album was a minor hit reaching 43 on Billboard's Top R&B Albums chart. The album scored two R&B hit songs, the lead single "Once Bitten, Twice Shy" peaking to number 9 on R&B singles and top 20 on Dutch and UK singles chart. "Don't Blow a Good Thing" reaching number 17, Williams also scored her first big dance hit as the single reached the top five on Billboard's Hot Dance Club Play chart. Overall sales of the album are unknown, it was reported by Billboard (magazine) to have sold only 220,000 between 1986 and 1987 though it endured on the Billboard R&B Album chart for over a year.

Track listing

Charts

References

External links
 

1986 debut albums
Vesta Williams albums
A&M Records albums